An abaniko (from the Spanish word abanico, "fan") is a type of hand fan from the Philippines.

Description  

The abaniko is common accessory for the baro't saya, the traditional ladies’ attire. Various ways of using and holding the abaniko may convey different meanings. For example, an open abaniko that covers the chest area is a sign of modesty, while rapid fan movements express the lady's displeasure.

Abaniko is sometimes referred to as pamaypáy, though the term actually refers to the non-folding, native hand fan of woven buri or anahaw leaves.

In sport 
Abaniko is the term for a striking blow in the martial art of Eskrima that resembles a fanning motion. It is executed with a single bastón (hardwood or rattan stick).

See also
Apir
Pamaypay

References

Philippine clothing
Ventilation fans
Philippine handicrafts